Manning is a family name.

Manning may also refer to:

Places

Australia
Manning, Western Australia
The Manning River

Austria
Manning, Upper Austria

Canada
Manning, Alberta
Manning Drive, Edmonton, Alberta

China
Manning, the Chinese Postal Map Romanisation of the name of Wanning City, Hainan Province

United States
Manning, Iowa
Manning, Kansas
Manning, South Carolina
Manning, Texas
Manning, North Dakota
Manning, Oregon an unincorporated area in NW Oregon

Seafaring and ships 
Manning the rail, a method of saluting or rendering honors used by naval vessels
, a United States Revenue Cutter Service cutter that served from 1898 to 1930
, a U.S. Navy destroyer escort that served from 1943 to 1947
R/V John R. Manning (FWS 1002), a U.S. Fish and Wildlife Service fisheries research vessel in commission from 1950 to 1969
Widow's manning or Widow's man, the practice of British ships in the Georgian era keeping seamen who were killed on the books so their wages could be paid to their widows

Other 
E.C. Manning Provincial Park, British Columbia, Canada
Manning (band), a band from Leeds, England
Manning Publications
Robert Manning Technology College, a secondary school in Bourne, Lincolnshire

See also 
 Manpower (disambiguation)
 Justice Manning (disambiguation)